The City of Manchester in North West England has traditionally been represented by various symbols. Most of these symbols are derived from heraldic emblems contained within the city's official heraldic achievement, which was officially adopted when the Borough of Manchester was granted city status in 1842. Notably, the motif of the worker bee has been widely used to represent the city as a symbol of industry.

Heraldry

The heraldic achievement of Manchester (colloquially but inaccurately referred to as a coat of arms) were granted to the Borough of Manchester in 1842 and continue to be used today by Manchester City Council.

Arms: Gules three Bendlets enhanced Or a Chief Argent thereon on Waves of the Sea a Ship under sail proper.
Crest: On a Wreath of the Colours a Terrestrial Globe semée of Bees volant all proper.
Supporters: On the dexter side a Heraldic White Hart Argent attired collared and chain reflexed over the back Or and on the sinister side a Lion guardant Or murally crowned Gules each charged on the shoulder with a rose of the last.
Motto: Concilio et Labore ("By Counsel and Work")

At the centre of the arms is a heater-style escutcheon, or shield, with gold stripes on a red field representing the rivers Irwell, Medlock and Irk, which flow through Manchester. The chief symbol at the top of the shield is a ship in full sail, representing the city's trade with the rest of the world. On either side of the shield are a pair of supporters, an antelope and a lion, each bearing the Red Rose of Lancaster on its shoulder, derived from the arms of King Henry IV, Duke of Lancaster. The lion is said to symbolise bravery and strength, while the antelope stands for peace, harmony, courage and discipline. At the top, the crest consists of seven bees flying over a globe, symbolising Manchester's industry being exported across the world. At the foot of the arms is the city's Latin motto, Concilio Et Labore, which is loosely translated to "by wisdom and effort" or  "by counsel and work", a phrase taken from the Book of : "Let reason go before every enterprise, and counsel before every action".

The heraldic arms appears on many architectural features around Manchester, including Manchester Town Hall and the Corn Exchange, and on blue plaque in the city.

Worker bee

The worker bee is one of the best-known symbols of Manchester. It was adopted as a motif for Manchester during the Industrial Revolution, at a time when Manchester was taking a leading role in new forms of mass production, and symbolises Mancunians' hard work during this era and Manchester being a hive of activity in the 19th century.

 was nicknamed Busy Bee after the Manchester bee symbol, and the bee is depicted on the ship's crest, which is also present on the ship's funnel. In the early 1970s the famous Boddingtons logo was introduced, depicting a barrel and two bees. The University of Manchester's coat of arms features three bees. The bees are depicted on many structures in Manchester such as lampposts and bollards. The 2009/10 away kit of Manchester City was inspired by the Manchester bee, featuring a black shirt with yellow shoulder inserts.

Following the May 2017 Manchester Arena bombing, the bee emblem gained popularity as a public symbol of unity against terrorism, appearing on protest banners and graffiti. Tattoo parlours both in and outside Manchester began to take part in the Manchester Tattoo Appeal, in which they offered bee tattoos to raise money for the victims of the attack.

Floral emblems

Lancashire rose
Manchester is part of the historic county of Lancashire, within the Salford Hundred. This is reflected in the use of the Red Rose of Lancaster in Manchester's heraldic arms. After the reform of local government in 1974, Manchester was removed from Lancashire for ceremonial and administrative purposes and brought into the new metropolitan county of Greater Manchester. After the change, both the City of Manchester and the new county retained the Lancastrian Rose in many emblems.

Cottongrass

Eriophorum angustifolium, commonly known as Cottongrass, is the county flower of Manchester. Cottongrass was selected because of Manchester's association with cotton, chiefly during the 19th century, when the city was given the nickname of Cottonopolis.

Three rivers
On the Manchester City Council arms, the three golden diagonal stripes on the red shield are meant to symbolise the three rivers which run through Manchester city centre: the Irwell, the Irk and the Medlock. This heraldic device has been adopted in other popular symbols, such as on the badges of F.C. United of Manchester, Manchester United F.C. (until the early 1970s) and Manchester City Football Club (between 1972 and 1997, the club replaced the stripes with the Red Rose of Lancashire, but the badge now combines the stripes and the flower)..

References

External links

Manchester
Manchester
Manchester
Manchester
Manchester